Ghumasan is village located in Gujarat State Mehsana district  in that village have two school and nine Hindu temple language is generally use in village is  Gujarati language. {
  "type": "FeatureCollection",
  "features": [
    {
      "type": "Feature",
      "properties": {},
      "geometry": {
        "type": "Point",
        "coordinates": [
          72.44272794661812,
          23.348514736812895
        ]
      }
    }
  ]
}

References

Villages in Mehsana district